Curium is a transuranic, radioactive chemical element with the symbol Cm and atomic number 96. This actinide element was named after eminent scientists Marie and Pierre Curie, both known for their research on radioactivity. Curium was first intentionally made by the team of Glenn T. Seaborg, Ralph A. James, and Albert Ghiorso in 1944, using the cyclotron at Berkeley. They bombarded the newly discovered element plutonium (the isotope 239Pu) with alpha particles. This was then sent to the Metallurgical Laboratory at University of Chicago where a tiny sample of curium was eventually separated and identified. The discovery was kept secret until after the end of World War II. The news was released to the public in November 1947. Most curium is produced by bombarding uranium or plutonium with neutrons in nuclear reactors – one tonne of spent nuclear fuel contains ~20 grams of curium.

Curium is a hard, dense, silvery metal with a high melting and boiling point for an actinide. It is paramagnetic at ambient conditions, but becomes antiferromagnetic upon cooling, and other magnetic transitions are also seen in many curium compounds. In compounds, curium usually has valence +3 and sometimes +4; the +3 valence is predominant in solutions. Curium readily oxidizes, and its oxides are a dominant form of this element. It forms strongly fluorescent complexes with various organic compounds, but there is no evidence of its incorporation into bacteria and archaea. If it gets into the human body, curium accumulates in bones, lungs, and liver, where it promotes cancer.

All known isotopes of curium are radioactive and have small critical mass for a nuclear chain reaction. They mostly emit α-particles; radioisotope thermoelectric generators can use the heat from this process, but this is hindered by the rarity and high cost of curium. Curium is used in making heavier actinides and the 238Pu radionuclide for power sources in artificial cardiac pacemakers and RTGs for spacecraft. It served as the α-source in the alpha particle X-ray spectrometers of several space probes, including the Sojourner, Spirit, Opportunity, and Curiosity Mars rovers and the Philae lander on comet 67P/Churyumov–Gerasimenko, to analyze the composition and structure of the surface.

History

Though curium had likely been produced in previous nuclear experiments as well as the natural nuclear fission reactor at Oklo, Gabon, it was first intentionally synthesized, isolated and identified in 1944, at University of California, Berkeley, by Glenn T. Seaborg, Ralph A. James, and Albert Ghiorso. In their experiments, they used a  cyclotron.

Curium was chemically identified at the Metallurgical Laboratory (now Argonne National Laboratory), University of Chicago. It was the third transuranium element to be discovered even though it is the fourth in the series – the lighter element americium was still unknown.

The sample was prepared as follows: first plutonium nitrate solution was coated on a platinum foil of ~0.5 cm2 area, the solution was evaporated and the residue was converted into plutonium(IV) oxide (PuO2) by annealing. Following cyclotron irradiation of the oxide, the coating was dissolved with nitric acid and then precipitated as the hydroxide using concentrated aqueous ammonia solution. The residue was dissolved in perchloric acid, and further separation was done by ion exchange to yield a certain isotope of curium. The separation of curium and americium was so painstaking that the Berkeley group initially called those elements pandemonium (from Greek for all demons or hell) and delirium (from Latin for madness).

Curium-242 was made in July–August 1944 by bombarding 239Pu with α-particles to produce curium with the release of a neutron:
 ^{239}_{94}Pu + ^{4}_{2}He -> ^{242}_{96}Cm + ^{1}_{0}n

Curium-242 was unambiguously identified by the characteristic energy of the α-particles emitted during the decay:
 ^{242}_{96}Cm -> ^{238}_{94}Pu + ^{4}_{2}He
The half-life of this alpha decay was first measured as 150 days and then corrected to 162.8 days.

Another isotope 240Cm was produced in a similar reaction in March 1945:
 ^{239}_{94}Pu + ^{4}_{2}He -> ^{240}_{96}Cm + 3^{1}_{0}n
The α-decay half-life of 240Cm was correctly determined as 26.7 days.

The discovery of curium and americium in 1944 was closely related to the Manhattan Project, so the results were confidential and declassified only in 1945. Seaborg leaked the synthesis of the elements 95 and 96 on the U.S. radio show for children, the Quiz Kids, five days before the official presentation at an American Chemical Society meeting on November 11, 1945, when one listener asked if any new transuranic element beside plutonium and neptunium had been discovered during the war. The discovery of curium (242Cm and 240Cm), its production, and its compounds was later patented listing only Seaborg as the inventor.

The element was named after Marie Curie and her husband Pierre Curie, who are known for discovering radium and for their work in radioactivity. It followed the example of gadolinium, a lanthanide element above curium in the periodic table, which was named after the explorer of rare-earth elements Johan Gadolin:
"As the name for the element of atomic number 96 we should like to propose "curium", with symbol Cm. The evidence indicates that element 96 contains seven 5f electrons and is thus analogous to the element gadolinium, with its seven 4f electrons in the regular rare earth series. On this basis element 96 is named after the Curies in a manner analogous to the naming of gadolinium, in which the chemist Gadolin was honored."

The first curium samples were barely visible, and were identified by their radioactivity. Louis Werner and Isadore Perlman made the first substantial sample of 30 µg curium-242 hydroxide at University of California, Berkeley in 1947 by bombarding americium-241 with neutrons. Macroscopic amounts of curium(III) fluoride were obtained in 1950 by W. W. T. Crane, J. C. Wallmann and B. B. Cunningham. Its magnetic susceptibility was very close to that of GdF3 providing the first experimental evidence for the +3 valence of curium in its compounds. Curium metal was produced only in 1951 by reduction of CmF3 with barium.

Characteristics

Physical

A synthetic, radioactive element, curium is a hard, dense metal with a silvery-white appearance and physical and chemical properties resembling gadolinium. Its melting point of 1344 °C is significantly higher than that of the previous elements neptunium (637 °C), plutonium (639 °C) and americium (1176 °C). In comparison, gadolinium melts at 1312 °C. Curium boils at 3556 °C. With a density of 13.52 g/cm3, curium is lighter than neptunium (20.45 g/cm3) and plutonium (19.8 g/cm3), but heavier than most other metals. Of two crystalline forms of curium, α-Cm is more stable at ambient conditions. It has a hexagonal symmetry, space group P63/mmc, lattice parameters a = 365 pm and c = 1182 pm, and four formula units per unit cell. The crystal consists of double-hexagonal close packing with the layer sequence ABAC and so is isotypic with α-lanthanum. At pressure >23 GPa, at room temperature, α-Cm becomes β-Cm, which has face-centered cubic symmetry, space group Fmm and lattice constant a = 493 pm. On further compression to 43 GPa, curium becomes an orthorhombic γ-Cm structure similar to α-uranium, with no further transitions observed up to 52 GPa. These three curium phases are also called Cm I, II and III.

Curium has peculiar magnetic properties. Its neighbor element americium shows no deviation from Curie-Weiss paramagnetism in the entire temperature range, but α-Cm transforms to an antiferromagnetic state upon cooling to 65–52 K, and β-Cm exhibits a ferrimagnetic transition at ~205 K. Curium pnictides show ferromagnetic transitions upon cooling: 244CmN and 244CmAs at 109 K, 248CmP at 73 K and 248CmSb at 162 K. The lanthanide analog of curium, gadolinium, and its pnictides, also show magnetic transitions upon cooling, but the transition character is somewhat different: Gd and GdN become ferromagnetic, and GdP, GdAs and GdSb show antiferromagnetic ordering.

In accordance with magnetic data, electrical resistivity of curium increases with temperature – about twice between 4 and 60 K – and then is nearly constant up to room temperature. There is a significant increase in resistivity over time (~) due to self-damage of the crystal lattice by alpha decay. This makes uncertain the true resistivity of curium (~). Curium's resistivity is similar to that of gadolinium, and the actinides plutonium and neptunium, but significantly higher than that of americium, uranium, polonium and thorium.

Under ultraviolet illumination, curium(III) ions show strong and stable yellow-orange fluorescence with a maximum in the range of 590–640 nm depending on their environment. The fluorescence originates from the transitions from the first excited state 6D7/2 and the ground state 8S7/2. Analysis of this fluorescence allows monitoring interactions between Cm(III) ions in organic and inorganic complexes.

Chemical

Curium ion in solution almost always has a +3 oxidation state, the most stable oxidation state for curium. A +4 oxidation state is seen mainly in a few solid phases, such as CmO2 and CmF4. Aqueous curium(IV) is only known in the presence of strong oxidizers such as potassium persulfate, and is easily reduced to curium(III) by radiolysis and even by water itself. Chemical behavior of curium is different from the actinides thorium and uranium, and is similar to americium and many lanthanides. In aqueous solution, the Cm3+ ion is colorless to pale green; Cm4+ ion is pale yellow. The optical absorption of Cm3+ ion contains three sharp peaks at 375.4, 381.2 and 396.5 nm and their strength can be directly converted into the concentration of the ions. The +6 oxidation state has only been reported once in solution in 1978, as the curyl ion: this was prepared from beta decay of americium-242 in the americium(V) ion . Failure to get Cm(VI) from oxidation of Cm(III) and Cm(IV) may be due to the high Cm4+/Cm3+ ionization potential and the instability of Cm(V).

Curium ions are hard Lewis acids and thus form most stable complexes with hard bases. The bonding is mostly ionic, with a small covalent component. Curium in its complexes commonly exhibits a 9-fold coordination environment, with a tricapped trigonal prismatic molecular geometry.

Isotopes

About 19 radioisotopes and 7 nuclear isomers, 233Cm to 251Cm, are known; none are stable. The longest half-lives are 15.6 million years (247Cm) and 348,000 years (248Cm). Other long-lived ones are 245Cm (8500 years), 250Cm (8300 years) and 246Cm (4760 years). Curium-250 is unusual: it mostly (~86%) decays by spontaneous fission. The most commonly used isotopes are 242Cm and 244Cm with the half-lives 162.8 days and 18.1 years, respectively.

All isotopes 242Cm-248Cm, and 250Cm, undergo a self-sustaining nuclear chain reaction and thus in principle can be a nuclear fuel in a reactor. As in most transuranic elements, nuclear fission cross section is especially high for the odd-mass curium isotopes 243Cm, 245Cm and 247Cm. These can be used in thermal-neutron reactors, whereas a mixture of curium isotopes is only suitable for fast breeder reactors since the even-mass isotopes are not fissile in a thermal reactor and accumulate as burn-up increases. The mixed-oxide (MOX) fuel, which is to be used in power reactors, should contain little or no curium because neutron activation of 248Cm will create californium. Californium is a strong neutron emitter, and would pollute the back end of the fuel cycle and increase the dose to reactor personnel. Hence, if minor actinides are to be used as fuel in a thermal neutron reactor, the curium should be excluded from the fuel or placed in special fuel rods where it is the only actinide present.

The adjacent table lists the critical masses for curium isotopes for a sphere, without moderator or reflector. With a metal reflector (30 cm of steel), the critical masses of the odd isotopes are about 3–4 kg. When using water (thickness ~20–30 cm) as the reflector, the critical mass can be as small as 59 gram for 245Cm, 155 gram for 243Cm and 1550 gram for 247Cm. There is significant uncertainty in these critical mass values. While it is usually on the order of 20%, the values for 242Cm and 246Cm were listed as large as 371 kg and 70.1 kg, respectively, by some research groups.

Curium is not currently used as nuclear fuel due to its low availability and high price. 245Cm and 247Cm have very small critical mass and so could be used in tactical nuclear weapons, but none are known to have been made. Curium-243 is not suitable for such, due to its short half-life and strong α emission, which would cause excessive heat. Curium-247 would be highly suitable due to its long half-life, which is 647 times longer than plutonium-239 (used in many existing nuclear weapons).

Occurrence

The longest-lived isotope, 247Cm, has half-life 15.6 million years; so any primordial curium, that is, present on Earth when it formed, should have decayed by now. Its past presence as an extinct radionuclide is detectable as an excess of its primordial, long-lived daughter 235U. Traces of curium may occur naturally in uranium minerals due to neutron capture and beta decay, though this has not been confirmed. Traces of 247Cm are also probably brought to Earth in cosmic rays, but again this has not been confirmed.

Curium is made artificially in small amounts for research purposes. It also occurs as one of the waste products in spent nuclear fuel. Curium is present in nature in some areas used for nuclear weapons testing. Analysis of the debris at the test site of the United States' first thermonuclear weapon, Ivy Mike, (1 November 1952, Enewetak Atoll), besides einsteinium, fermium, plutonium and americium also revealed isotopes of berkelium, californium and curium, in particular 245Cm, 246Cm and smaller quantities of 247Cm, 248Cm and 249Cm.

Atmospheric curium compounds are poorly soluble in common solvents and mostly adhere to soil particles. Soil analysis revealed about 4,000 times higher concentration of curium at the sandy soil particles than in water present in the soil pores. An even higher ratio of about 18,000 was measured in loam soils.

The transuranium elements from americium to fermium, including curium, occurred naturally in the natural nuclear fission reactor at Oklo, but no longer do so.

Curium, and other non-primordial actinides, have also been detected in the spectrum of Przybylski's Star.

Synthesis

Isotope preparation
Curium is made in small amounts in nuclear reactors, and by now only kilograms of 242Cm and 244Cm have been accumulated, and grams or even milligrams for heavier isotopes. Hence the high price of curium, which has been quoted at 160–185 USD per milligram, with a more recent estimate at US$2,000/g for 242Cm and US$170/g for 244Cm. In nuclear reactors, curium is formed from 238U in a series of nuclear reactions. In the first chain, 238U captures a neutron and converts into 239U, which via β− decay transforms into 239Np and 239Pu.

Further neutron capture followed by β−-decay gives americium (241Am) which further becomes 242Cm:

For research purposes, curium is obtained by irradiating not uranium but plutonium, which is available in large amounts from spent nuclear fuel. A much higher neutron flux is used for the irradiation that results in a different reaction chain and formation of 244Cm:

Curium-244 alpha decays to 240Pu, but it also absorbs neutrons, hence a small amount of heavier curium isotopes. Of those, 247Cm and 248Cm are popular in scientific research due to their long half-lives. But the production rate of 247Cm in thermal neutron reactors is low because it is prone to fission due to thermal neutrons. Synthesis of 250Cm by neutron capture is unlikely due to the short half-life of the intermediate 249Cm (64 min), which β− decays to the berkelium isotope 249Bk.

The above cascade of (n,γ) reactions gives a mix of different curium isotopes. Their post-synthesis separation is cumbersome, so a selective synthesis is desired. Curium-248 is favored for research purposes due to its long half-life. The most efficient way to prepare this isotope is by α-decay of the californium isotope 252Cf, which is available in relatively large amounts due to its long half-life (2.65 years). About 35–50 mg of 248Cm is produced thus, per year. The associated reaction produces 248Cm with isotopic purity of 97%.

Another isotope, 245Cm, can be obtained for research, from α-decay of 249Cf; the latter isotope is produced in small amounts from β−-decay of 249Bk.

Metal preparation

Most synthesis routines yield a mix of actinide isotopes as oxides, from which a given isotope of curium needs to be separated. An example procedure could be to dissolve spent reactor fuel (e.g. MOX fuel) in nitric acid, and remove the bulk of the uranium and plutonium using a PUREX (Plutonium – URanium EXtraction) type extraction with tributyl phosphate in a hydrocarbon. The lanthanides and the remaining actinides are then separated from the aqueous residue (raffinate) by a diamide-based extraction to give, after stripping, a mixture of trivalent actinides and lanthanides. A curium compound is then selectively extracted using multi-step chromatographic and centrifugation techniques with an appropriate reagent. Bis-triazinyl bipyridine complex has been recently proposed as such reagent which is highly selective to curium. Separation of curium from the very chemically similar americium can also be done by treating a slurry of their hydroxides in aqueous sodium bicarbonate with ozone at elevated temperature. Both americium and curium are present in solutions mostly in the +3 valence state; americium oxidizes to soluble Am(IV) complexes, but curium stays unchanged and so can be isolated by repeated centrifugation.

Metallic curium is obtained by reduction of its compounds. Initially, curium(III) fluoride was used for this purpose. The reaction was done in an environment free of water and oxygen, in an apparatus made of tantalum and tungsten, using elemental barium or lithium as reducing agents.

Another possibility is reduction of curium(IV) oxide using a magnesium-zinc alloy in a melt of magnesium chloride and magnesium fluoride.

Compounds and reactions

Oxides
Curium readily reacts with oxygen forming mostly Cm2O3 and CmO2 oxides, but the divalent oxide CmO is also known. Black CmO2 can be obtained by burning curium oxalate, nitrate, or hydroxide in pure oxygen. Upon heating to 600–650 °C in vacuum (about 0.01 Pa), it transforms into the whitish Cm2O3:
 4CmO2 ->[\Delta T] 2Cm2O3 + O2.

Or, Cm2O3 can be obtained by reducing CmO2 with molecular hydrogen:
 2CmO2 + H2 -> Cm2O3 + H2O

Also, a number of ternary oxides of the type M(II)CmO3 are known, where M stands for a divalent metal, such as barium.

Thermal oxidation of trace quantities of curium hydride (CmH2–3) has been reported to give a volatile form of CmO2 and the volatile trioxide CmO3, one of two known examples of the very rare +6 state for curium. Another observed species was reported to behave similar to a supposed plutonium tetroxide and was tentatively characterized as CmO4, with curium in the extremely rare +8 state; but new experiments seem to indicate that CmO4 does not exist, and have cast doubt on the existence of PuO4 as well.

Halides
The colorless curium(III) fluoride (CmF3) can be made by adding fluoride ions into curium(III)-containing solutions. The brown tetravalent curium(IV) fluoride (CmF4) on the other hand is only obtained by reacting curium(III) fluoride with molecular fluorine:
 

A series of ternary fluorides are known of the form A7Cm6F31 (A = alkali metal).

The colorless curium(III) chloride (CmCl3) is made by reacting curium hydroxide (Cm(OH)3) with anhydrous hydrogen chloride gas. It can be further turned into other halides such as curium(III) bromide (colorless to light green) and curium(III) iodide (colorless), by reacting it with the ammonia salt of the corresponding halide at temperatures of ~400–450°C:
 

Or, one can heat curium oxide to ~600°C with the corresponding acid (such as hydrobromic for curium bromide). Vapor phase hydrolysis of curium(III) chloride gives curium oxychloride:

Chalcogenides and pnictides
Sulfides, selenides and tellurides of curium have been obtained by treating curium with gaseous sulfur, selenium or tellurium in vacuum at elevated temperature. Curium pnictides of the type CmX are known for nitrogen, phosphorus, arsenic and antimony. They can be prepared by reacting either curium(III) hydride (CmH3) or metallic curium with these elements at elevated temperature.

Organocurium compounds and biological aspects

Organometallic complexes analogous to uranocene are known also for other actinides, such as thorium, protactinium, neptunium, plutonium and americium. Molecular orbital theory predicts a stable "curocene" complex (η8-C8H8)2Cm, but it has not been reported experimentally yet.

Formation of the complexes of the type  (BTP = 2,6-di(1,2,4-triazin-3-yl)pyridine), in solutions containing n-C3H7-BTP and Cm3+ ions has been confirmed by EXAFS. Some of these BTP-type complexes selectively interact with curium and thus are useful for separating it from lanthanides and another actinides. Dissolved Cm3+ ions bind with many organic compounds, such as hydroxamic acid, urea, fluorescein and adenosine triphosphate. Many of these compounds are related to biological activity of various microorganisms. The resulting complexes show strong yellow-orange emission under UV light excitation, which is convenient not only for their detection, but also for studying interactions between the Cm3+ ion and the ligands via changes in the half-life (of the order ~0.1 ms) and spectrum of the fluorescence.

Curium has no biological significance. There are a few reports on biosorption of Cm3+ by bacteria and archaea, but no evidence for incorporation of curium into them.

Applications

Radionuclides

Curium is one of the most radioactive isolable elements. Its two most common isotopes 242Cm and 244Cm are strong alpha emitters (energy 6 MeV); they have fairly short half-lives, 162.8 days and 18.1 years, and give as much as 120 W/g and 3 W/g of heat, respectively. Therefore, curium can be used in its common oxide form in radioisotope thermoelectric generators like those in spacecraft. This application has been studied for the 244Cm isotope, while 242Cm was abandoned due to its prohibitive price, around 2000 USD/g. 243Cm with a ~30-year half-life and good energy yield of ~1.6 W/g could be a suitable fuel, but it gives significant amounts of harmful gamma and beta rays from radioactive decay products. As an α-emitter, 244Cm needs much less radiation shielding, but it has a high spontaneous fission rate, and thus a lot of neutron and gamma radiation. Therefore, this use of curium is currently considered impractical.

A more promising use of 242Cm is for making 238Pu, a better radioisotope for thermoelectric generators such as in heart pacemakers. The alternate routes to 238Pu use the (n,γ) reaction of 237Np, or deuteron bombardment of uranium, though both reactions always produce 236Pu as an undesired by-product since the latter decays to 232U with strong gamma emission. Curium is a common starting material for making higher transuranic and superheavy elements. Thus, bombarding 248Cm with neon (22Ne), magnesium (26Mg), or calcium (48Ca) yields isotopes of seaborgium (265Sg), hassium (269Hs and 270Hs), and livermorium (292Lv, 293Lv, and possibly 294Lv). Californium was discovered when a microgram-sized target of curium-242 was irradiated with 35 MeV alpha particles using the  cyclotron at Berkeley:
 +  →  + 
Only about 5,000 atoms of californium were produced in this experiment.

The odd-mass curium isotopes 243Cm, 245Cm, and 247Cm are all highly fissile and can release additional energy in a thermal spectrum nuclear reactor. All curium isotopes are fissionable in fast-neutron reactors. This is one of the motives for minor actinide separation and transmutation in the nuclear fuel cycle, helping to reduce the long-term radiotoxicity of used, or spent nuclear fuel.

X-ray spectrometer
The most practical application of 244Cm—though rather limited in total volume—is as α-particle source in alpha particle X-ray spectrometers (APXS). These instruments were installed on the Sojourner, Mars, Mars 96, Mars Exploration Rovers and Philae comet lander, as well as the Mars Science Laboratory to analyze the composition and structure of the rocks on the surface of planet Mars. APXS was also used in the Surveyor 5–7 moon probes but with a 242Cm source.

An elaborate APXS setup has a sensor head containing six curium sources with a total decay rate of several tens of millicuries (roughly one gigabecquerel). The sources are collimated on a sample, and the energy spectra of the alpha particles and protons scattered from the sample are analyzed (proton analysis is done only in some spectrometers). These spectra contain quantitative information on all major elements in the sample except for hydrogen, helium and lithium.

Safety
Due to its radioactivity, curium and its compounds must be handled in appropriate labs under special arrangements. While curium itself mostly emits α-particles which are absorbed by thin layers of common materials, some of its decay products emit significant fractions of beta and gamma rays, which require a more elaborate protection. If consumed, curium is excreted within a few days and only 0.05% is absorbed in the blood. From there, ~45% goes to the liver, 45% to the bones, and the remaining 10% is excreted. In bone, curium accumulates on the inside of the interfaces to the bone marrow and does not significantly redistribute with time; its radiation destroys bone marrow and thus stops red blood cell creation. The biological half-life of curium is about 20 years in the liver and 50 years in the bones. Curium is absorbed in the body much more strongly via inhalation, and the allowed total dose of 244Cm in soluble form is 0.3 μCi. Intravenous injection of 242Cm- and 244Cm-containing solutions to rats increased the incidence of bone tumor, and inhalation promoted lung and liver cancer.

Curium isotopes are inevitably present in spent nuclear fuel (about 20 g/tonne). The isotopes 245Cm–248Cm have decay times of thousands of years and must be removed to neutralize the fuel for disposal. Such a procedure involves several steps, where curium is first separated and then converted by neutron bombardment in special reactors to short-lived nuclides. This procedure, nuclear transmutation, while well documented for other elements, is still being developed for curium.

References

Bibliography
 
 Holleman, Arnold F. and Wiberg, Nils  Lehrbuch der Anorganischen Chemie, 102 Edition, de Gruyter, Berlin 2007, .
 Penneman, R. A. and Keenan T. K. The radiochemistry of americium and curium, University of California, Los Alamos, California, 1960

External links

 Curium at The Periodic Table of Videos (University of Nottingham)
 NLM Hazardous Substances Databank – Curium, Radioactive

 
Chemical elements
Chemical elements with double hexagonal close-packed structure
Actinides
American inventions
Synthetic elements
Marie Curie
Pierre Curie